Anton Endstorfer (15 July 1880 – 2 September 1961) was an Austrian sculptor. His work was part of the sculpture event in the art competition at the 1932 Summer Olympics.

References

1880 births
1961 deaths
20th-century Austrian sculptors
Austrian male sculptors
Olympic competitors in art competitions
Artists from Vienna
20th-century Austrian male artists